Roland Bertin (born 16 November 1930) is a French stage and film actor. He has appeared in at least 100 films and television shows since 1970.

Selected filmography

 Le Petit théâtre de Jean Renoir (1970) (a.k.a. The Little Theatre of Jean Renoir)
 Section spéciale (1970)
 Le Petit Marcel (1976) (a.k.a. Little Marcel)
 Monsieur Klein (1976)
 Madame Claude (1977) (a.k.a. The French Woman)
 Le Gang (1977)
 Butterfly on the Shoulder (1978)
 Les Sœurs Brontë (1979) (a.k.a. The Bronte Sisters)
 La Femme flic (1980) (a.k.a. The  Woman Cop)
 Diva (1981)
 La Truite (1982) (The Trout)
 L'Homme blessé (1983) (a.k.a. The Wounded Man)
Charlotte for Ever (1986) as Leon
 Jenatsch (1987)
 Le Mari de la coiffeuse (1990) (a.k.a. The Hairdresser's Husband)
 Cyrano de Bergerac (1990)
 La Fille de l'air (1992)
 Enfermés dehors (2006)

References

External links

1930 births
Living people
French male film actors
French male stage actors
Male actors from Paris
Knights of the Ordre national du Mérite
20th-century French male actors
Sociétaires of the Comédie-Française